Stilbosis lonchocarpella is a moth in the family Cosmopterigidae. It was described by August Busck in 1934. It is found in Cuba and mainland North America, where it has been recorded from Florida.

The wingspan is about 8 mm. Adults have been recorded on wing from December to April.

Larvae have been recorded feeding on Lonchocarpus sericeus.

References

Moths described in 1934
Chrysopeleiinae
Moths of North America